Bob's Yer Uncle is a rock band founded in 1995 based in Chicago, Illinois.  It has been described as, "rhythms ... are complex but do have a toe-tapping groove to them, and the vocals hide the darker tone of the lyrics in their simple beauty."

Regular Members 

 Adrian Matthews - lead vocals, acoustic and electric guitars.
 Bill Henshell - 6 and 12 string electric and acoustic guitars, mandolin, bass, vocals.
 Jaxon - Percussion.
 Paul Young - 4, 5, and 8 string basses.
 Phil Barish - Piano, organ and synthesizers, vocals.

Discography 

 1999 - Innocence and Experience
 2012  - Xplod-i-mite

References

External links 
 Official Site
 2001 Review of Innocence and Experience, by Darryl Cater, no longer active on ChicagoGigs.com, but captured on the Internet Archive.
 1999 Review of Innocence and Experience, by Christopher Thelen on Dailyvault.

Musical groups from Chicago
Rock music groups from Illinois